

Arthropods

Insects

Archosauromorphs

Newly named non-avian dinosaurs
Data courtesy of George Olshevsky's dinosaur genera list.

Birds

Newly named birds

Synapsids

Non-mammalian

References

1950s in paleontology
Paleontology
Paleontology 8